Chansons ou versions inédites de jeunesse (Early Unreleased Songs or Versions) is an album of Jacques Brel rare early recordings first issued as part of the 16-CD box set Boîte à Bonbons on 23 September 2003. This CD contains 28 titles: 26 songs from Radio Hasselt recorded 14 August 1953 and 21 August 1953, a recording from the Brel family's private collection, and a 1962 recording from Dutch television AVRO.

Track listing 

 Tracks 1-26 recorded on 14 August and 21 August 1953 at Radio Hasselt
Track 27 recorded in 1953, for Swiss radio Radio Suisse Romande <ref>2 
 Track 28 recorded 20 February 1963 at Hilversum, Netherlands, for TV show 'Club Domino'. Broadcast 20 April 1963<ref>2. 
 Tracks 4, 6, 10, 14, 18, 20, 21, 25, 26 were re-recorded and released on Grand Jacques in 1954.
 Tracks 7 and 9 were re-recorded and released on Quand on n'a que l'amour in 1957.
 Track 2 was re-recorded and released on Au Printemps in 1958.

References 

2. research in book 'Jacques Brel, Leven en Liefde 1929-1978' by René Seghers, Baarn :TIRION/Lannoo, 2003  

Jacques Brel albums
2003 albums
French-language albums
Barclay (record label) albums
Albums conducted by Michel Legrand
Albums conducted by André Popp
Albums conducted by François Rauber